State Route 319 (SR-319) is a state highway in the U.S. state of Utah. Located entirely within Wasatch County, it connects US-40/US-189 to Jordanelle State Park.

Route description

SR-319 begins at US-40/US-189 at the Mayflower interchange (exit 8 on that highway) and proceeds to the east as a two-lane roadway with a center turn lane. The route passes a large hotel complex before veering to the southeast, towards the Jordanelle Reservoir. After entering the boundaries of Jordanelle State Park, it turns to the south and terminates at the state park fee booth.

History

In conjunction with the construction of the Jordanelle Reservoir in the late 1980s, a new state park was proposed on its western shore, with an access road connecting it to the new alignment of US-40/189. UDOT recommended this connection be added to the state highway system. Since the purpose of the new route would be to serve a state park, it was given a number greater than 280.

The route was slightly modified in 2001, when the legislature moved the east end to the state park fee station.

Major intersections

References

319
Utah State Routes in Wasatch County, Utah